A number of steamships have been named Salamanca, including:

, a cargo ship in service 1906–07
, a Hansa A Type cargo ship in service 1967–69

Ship names